The 2001 British Grand Prix (formally the LIV Foster's British Grand Prix) was a Formula One motor race held on 15 July 2001 at Silverstone in Northamptonshire, England. It was the eleventh race of the 2001 FIA Formula One World Championship.

The 60-lap race was won by Mika Häkkinen, driving a McLaren-Mercedes. Drivers' Championship leader Michael Schumacher took pole position in his Ferrari, with Häkkinen alongside him on the front row; the Finn overtook Schumacher on lap 5 and led for the remainder of the race, except during the first round of pit stops. It was Häkkinen's first victory of the season, and his 19th overall. Schumacher finished over half a minute behind, with teammate Rubens Barrichello third.

There were five retirements during the race: Jarno Trulli's Jordan and Olivier Panis's BAR were eliminated in separate first-corner collisions; David Coulthard's McLaren suffered a suspension failure; and Ralf Schumacher's Williams and Luciano Burti's Prost suffered engine failures. Tarso Marques failed to qualify his Minardi as a result of not setting a time within 107% of Michael Schumacher's pole time. Heinz-Harald Frentzen finished seventh in the other Jordan, in what would turn out to be his last race for the team before he was sacked four days before the next race in Germany.

Coulthard's retirement meant that Michael Schumacher extended his lead in the Drivers' Championship to 37 points with six races remaining.

Background
Going into the race, Ferrari driver Michael Schumacher led the Drivers' Championship with 78 points, ahead of his main rival David Coulthard (47 points) and Ralf Schumacher (30). Rubens Barrichello was a close fourth with 30 points and his Williams teammate Juan Pablo Montoya was fifth on twelve points. In the Constructors' Championship, Ferrari was leading with 108 points, fifty-two ahead of their rival McLaren in second. Williams were third on 43 points, whilst Sauber (16) and Jordan (15) were in a close battle for fourth place. Ferrari had so far won the most of the races of the season with six, compared to McLaren and Williams with two each. Championship drivers Barrichello and Montoya had secured second-place finishes whilst Nick Heidfeld, Jacques Villeneuve, Eddie Irvine and Mika Häkkinen had all taken third-place finishes.

After the previous year's British Grand Prix had been afflicted with heavy rain, causing the closure of Silverstone's car parks which forced spectators to walk long distances to attend the event, the organisers of the British Grand Prix, the Motor Sports Association was granted a reprieve by Formula One's governing body the Fédération Internationale de l'Automobile after promising to rectify the problems, and the next holding of the British Grand Prix was given a provisional date of 13 May 2001.

After the French Grand Prix on 1 July the teams conducted testing sessions at various circuits across Europe between 3–6 July to prepare for the British Grand Prix. The Jordan, McLaren, Sauber, BAR and Jaguar teams tested at the Autodromo Nazionale Monza circuit. Heinz-Harald Frentzen set the fastest time on the first day, two-tenths of a second in front of Heidfeld. McLaren test driver Alexander Wurz recorded the fastest lap time on the second day. Irvine pulled out of the test sessions early because of reoccurring neck pains he had been suffering since June and was replaced by the team's test driver André Lotterer from the afternoon of the second day. Coulthard was quickest on the third day's running. Testing was suspended when Jordan test driver Ricardo Zonta spun off into a gravel trap after his car sustained a component failure and sustained heavy damage. Kimi Räikkönen for the Sauber team was fastest on the fourth and final day of testing. A crash by Häkkinen and a spin by Olivier Panis in the afternoon of the fourth day brought out the red-flags.

Some teams made alterations to their cars in preparation for the race. Jaguar introduced a revised floor along with new bargeboards, whilst McLaren introduced minor aerodynamic revisions which included new front brake ducts. Sauber had brought new brake ducts and revised their bargeboards and Williams also brought new bargeboards for the race weekend. Prost reverted to an older undertray for Jean Alesi's car who preferred it over a new version débuted for the race.

Practice
Four practice sessions were held before the Sunday race, two each on Friday and Saturday. The Friday morning and afternoon sessions each lasted an hour. The third and final practice sessions were held on Saturday morning and lasted 45 minutes. Conditions were cloudy and blustery for the Friday practice sessions with heavy rain hitting the circuit before the day's running ended, preventing drivers from recording faster lap times. Michael Schumacher set the fastest lap of the first session after 45 minutes with a time of 1:23.619, almost eight-tenths of a second faster than teammate Barrichello in second. The two McLaren drivers were third and fourth with Häkkinen ahead of Coulthard. Frentzen (with a lap of 1:25.234) was fifth fastest, ahead of Irvine and Panis. Villeneuve, Jarno Trulli and Räikkönen (despite spinning at the Abbey chicane) rounded out the top ten fastest drivers of the session. Montoya (who set the thirteenth quickest time) spun at Vale corner after pushing hard with ten minutes remaining in the session but continued, and his Williams teammate Ralf Schumacher lost the rear-end of his car at the exit of Bridge corner and managed to continue. In the second practice session, Häkkinen set the fastest time of the day with a lap of 1:22.827; Coulthard finished with the second-fastest time which was half a second off his teammate's pace. Both Ferrari drivers were third and fourth fastest with Barrichello ahead of Michael Schumacher. Frentzen's car developed an oil leak at the start of the session but duplicated his first-session result in fifth. Heidfeld was sixth, with Pedro de la Rosa seventh fastest. Ralf Schumacher, Trulli and Räikkönen completed the top ten. Fernando Alonso damaged the undertray of his Minardi after he found it difficult to drive around Copse corner and drove back to his garage.
 
Heavy rain continued to affect the track in the Saturday free practice sessions, with several drivers spinning off on the slippery surface. Michael Schumacher set the pace in the third practice session with a lap of 1:31.430. Frentzen was second-quickest, three-tenths of a second off Michael Schumacher's pace. The McLarens of Häkkinen and Coulthard had the third and fourth fastest times respectively. Barrichello set the fifth-fastest time, ahead of Heidfeld in sixth and Trulli in seventh. Ralf Schumacher, Panis and Montoya completed the top ten. Villeneuve was unable to record a lap time due to a gearbox problem, which caused him to stop at the exit of the pit lane. More rain fell during the interval between the third and fourth practice sessions, meaning that drivers were unable to improve on their lap times and continued to slide off the track. Michael Schumacher remained the fastest driver, followed by Frentzen, Häkkinen, Coulthard, Barrichello and Heidfeld, with Trulli, Räikkönen (who took evasive action to avoid a collision with a hare which had breached circuit perimeters), Panis and Ralf Schumacher completing the top ten ahead of qualifying.

Qualifying
Saturday's afternoon one hour qualifying session saw each driver was limited to twelve laps, with the starting order decided by their fastest laps. During this session, the 107% rule was in effect, which necessitated each driver to set a time within 107 per cent of the quickest lap to qualify for the race. The track was clean from the heavy rain showers and lap times progressively got faster as the session progressed. Michael Schumacher clinched the 40th pole position of his career, his eighth of the 2001 season and his first at the Silverstone circuit, with a time of 1:20.477. He reported that the qualifying session was difficult for him and he used his first two quick runs to fine tune his car's set-up because of the lack of running on a dry track during Saturday's practice sessions. He was joined on the front row of the grid by Häkkinen who recorded a lap time 0.082 seconds off Michael Schumacher's pace. He said he was pleased to be on the front row and close to the pole position, but lost time because he was held up on his final quick run which he felt cost him the chance to secure the pole position. Coulthard took third and said he was unable to find the optimum balance for his McLaren because of the changing track conditions. Trulli qualified fourth despite running over a kerb at the exit of Becketts corner which damaged his front-left suspension causing him to slow and then pulled over to the side of the circuit. His Jordan teammate Frentzen secured fifth position and reported no problems with his car. Barrichello took sixth place and he spent his first two runs on his set-up, and lost time on his fourth run because he was twice blocked by Enrique Bernoldi's Arrows (who was on an in-lap), preventing Barrichello from improving on his lap time.

Räikkönen and Heidfeld took seventh and ninth positions respectively for Sauber; Räikkönen was satisfied with his starting position as he made small changes to the handling balance of his C20 chassis, whilst Heidfeld was held up by Ralf Schumacher and both McLarens who were driving slowly in the final section of the track, causing Heidfeld to go up across an inside kerb and onto grass which lost him three-tenths of a second. The two Saubers were sandwiched by Montoya in the faster Williams who bent a push-rod on his first run after clipping the kerb at the exit of Becketts and took over the spare car set up for Ralf Schumacher. Ralf Schumacher rounded out the top ten qualifiers and said he felt unlucky as his fastest lap was set on his second run and was held up by traffic when track conditions had improved. Panis recorded the eleventh fastest lap time and reported the balance of his car was good but had a problem with his traction control system which was quickly rectified by his engineers. Villeneuve had an engine problem on his first run and went into the spare BAR monocoque until his race car was fixed and was twelfth fastest. He was ahead of de la Rosa in the faster of the two Jaguars and did not report any problems. Alesi found the old version of his Prost's undertray gave him more consistent handling and recorded the 14th fastest lap. Irvine qualified in 15th position and had a suspension failure and switched to the spare Jaguar which was set-up for de la Rosa. Burti had a large amount of understeer which restricted him to 16th on the grid. Verstappen gradually improved his car throughout the session and secured 17th place; his teammate Bernoldi took the 20th position and had a throttle issue on his first run which affected his momentum and was held up by Verstappen on his final run. The two Arrows were separated by the Benettons of Jenson Button and Giancarlo Fisichella; Button was unable to record a faster lap time because he was held up by traffic and Fisichella complained of understeer and poor grip. Alonso secured 21st and completed the grid. His teammate Tarso Marques failed to set a lap within 107% of Michael Schumacher's pole time and was not allowed to start the race after an appeal by Minardi was rejected by the stewards.

Qualifying classification

Warm-up
The drivers took to the track at 08:30 BST for a 30-minute warm-up session in dry and partly sunny weather conditions. The McLarens maintained their good form from qualifying; Coulthard had the fastest time of 1:22.994 set in the closing minutes of the session. Häkkinen finished the session with the third-fastest time and was fastest in the middle part of the session. Trulli was second fastest and his teammate Frentzen rounded out the top four fastest drivers having held the fastest lap early in the session.

Race
The race started at 13:00 local time. Michael Schumacher maintained his starting line advantage heading into Copse corner followed by Häkkinen. Coulthard, driving on the inside line heading into Copse, was hit in the rear-end by Trulli who took the inside line and both spun with Trulli going into the gravel trap at Copse and Coulthard went across the grass verge and onto the pit lane exit road. Further back, Villeneuve was unable to shift into a higher gear because his automatic upshifting system failed and was forced to use to switch to a manual start. He then drove in a gear he did not intend to drive in, and applied his brakes hard locking his front wheels, rendering him unable to steer and made contact with teammate Panis, who retired from the race after going into the gravel trap at Copse next to Trulli's car. Montoya made a quick gateway, moving up from eighth to third by the end of the first lap and his teammate Ralf Schumacher made up five positions over the same distance. Frentzen, however, made a poor start and lost three positions before the first lap ended. Further behind, Verstappen made the best start in the field as he moved up from 17th to eleventh and Alesi moved up four positions. At the end of the first lap, Michael Schumacher led by 0.3 seconds from Häkkinen and both drivers were followed by Montoya, Barrichello, Ralf Schumacher, Räikkönen, Heidfeld, Frentzen, Alesi, Villeneuve, Verstappen, de la Rosa, Button, Bernoldi, Irvine, Burti, Fisichella, Coulthard and Alonso.

Michael Schumacher started to maintain a 0.2-second lead over Häkkinen who began a challenge for the lead. Häkkinen set the fastest lap of the race so far on the third lap – a 1:25.861 – to close the gap to Michael Schumacher to one-tenth of a second. Coulthard suffered a rear-suspension failure and spun off into the gravel trap at Priory corner, ending his race. Verstappen passed Villeneuve and Alesi to take over ninth position on lap 4, whilst Fisichella went off the track and drove through the gravel trap at Copse and rejoined behind Alonso on the same lap. Michael Schumacher lost control of his car at the entry to Copse, allowing Häkkinen to take advantage and move into the lead at the start of lap 5; the Finn then started to pull away. Burti became the third retirement of the race when his engine blew on lap 6 and dropped oil on the track, causing the marshals to display the red and yellow striped warning flag. As Häkkinen continued to extend his lead, Montoya closed the gap to Michael Schumacher to 1.6 seconds by lap 10. Villeneuve overtook Alesi at Stowe corner and moved into tenth position on lap 11. By lap 15, Montoya had further closed the gap to Michael Schumacher and passed the Ferrari driver to take over second position as he drove down the start/finish straight heading towards Stowe. By lap 20, Häkkinen had a lead of 25.2 seconds over Montoya, who in turn was 4.5 seconds in front of Michael Schumacher and was pulling away from the Ferrari driver. Barrichello was a further 10.9 seconds behind his teammate and was being caught by Ralf Schumacher in fifth.

Räikkönen was the first driver to make a pit stop on lap 20, rejoining in tenth place. The McLaren and Ferrari teams were employing different strategies – the McLaren team were planning a two-stop strategy whereas the Ferrari team were planning to make pit stop. Häkkinen made his pit stop from the lead on the following lap and came out behind Montoya. Heideld also had a pit stop on the same lap, coming out in tenth position. Montoya took over the lead of the race for four laps before taking his pit stop on lap 25 having been placed under pressure by Häkkinen who moved back into first place. Montoya re-emerged in fourth position, behind the duel between Barrichello and Ralf Schumacher for position. With a clear road ahead of him, Häkkinen increased his lead to ten seconds over Michael Schumacher by lap 27 as he set two consecutive fastest laps. Further back, Montoya was being held up by teammate Ralf Schumacher and Barrichello. Seven laps later, the Williams team showed Ralf Schumacher a switch sign on his pit board, asking him to let Montoya through. Ralf Schumacher did not let Montoya past as he felt he was driving quickly to be able to overtake Barrichello but was unable to pass the Brazilian driver. Ralf Schumacher made his pit stop on the 35th lap, allowing Montoya to battle Barrichello for third place. His pit stop took longer than usual as his mechanics had difficulties removing the refuelling nozzle from his car. Ralf Schumacher pulled over to the side of the circuit two laps later when his engine cut out, forcing him to retire.

Häkkinen and Michael Schumacher both made their pit stops on lap 39, with Häkkinen retaining his lead and Schumacher coming out behind teammate Barrichello and Montoya. On lap 40 Alonso, who was battling with both Benetton drivers and Bernoldi in the second Arrows for position, had his left-front wheel become detached from his Minardi close to the pit lane entry and the wheel rolled into a gravel trap before hitting a tyre wall. This resulted in his pit stop becoming longer than originally planned, Montoya, Heidfeld and Frentzen all made pit stops one lap later. Barrichello made a pit stop on lap 42 and came out holding third position ahead of Montoya and both Sauber cars. Further down the field, Bernoldi and Fisichella stopped for their second pit stops and both drivers ran side-by-side exiting the pit lane and Bernoldi slowed down to allow Fisichella to move in front. Irvine was the final driver to pit for tyres and fuel on lap 46.

At the conclusion of lap 47, with the scheduled pit stops completed, Häkkinen led Michael Schumacher by 23.9 seconds, followed by Barrichello, Montoya, Räikkönen and Heidfeld. Häkkinen continued to lap consistently faster than Michael Schumacher, stretching his lead to 33.6 seconds by the chequered flag. It was his first win of the season, and the 19th of his Formula One career. Michael Schumacher finished 25.6 seconds ahead of teammate Barrichello, with Montoya the last driver on the lead lap. Räikkonen took fifth with teammate Heidfeld scoring the final point for sixth. Frentzen, Villeneuve, Irvine and Verstappen completed the top ten finishers. Alesi, de la Rosa, Fisichella, Bernoldi and Button took the next five positions with Alonso the last of the classified finishers.

Post-race
The top three drivers appeared on the podium to collect their trophies and in a later press conference. Häkkinen stated it felt "really good" to win the race as he had endured a difficult season so far. He also said that he hoped he would win more races before the season was over and it was "very important" that he passed Michael Schumacher for the lead as it would have been "difficult to get the distance and the gap" he required for his two pit stops. Michael Schumacher said that he had a "difficult day" because his car was hard to drive but praised Häkkinen for taking the victory. He also denied suggestions from Formula One commentators that he had problems with his traction control system. Barrichello said that he was happy with third place and that his Ferrari team believed their tyres would not last for a long period time around the Silverstone circuit. He also felt it was the right decision to stay out on the race track longer than Montoya.

Race classification
Drivers who scored championship points are denoted in bold.

Championship standings after the race

Drivers' Championship standings

Constructors' Championship standings

References

British Grand Prix
British Grand Prix
Grand Prix
British Grand Prix